Peter Scanlon may refer to:
 Peter Scanlon (businessman) (1931–2009), American businessman
 Peter Scanlon (taekwondo) (born 1970), Australian taekwondo practitioner